Denner Fernando Melz (born 30 December 1999), simply known as Denner, is a Brazilian professional footballer who plays as a midfielder for Sport, on loan from Athletico Paranaense.

Club career
Born in Itapiranga, Santa Catarina, Denner finished his formation with Juventude, after having a three-month stint at Internacional in 2011. In late January 2018, after impressing with the under-20 squad in the year's Copa São Paulo de Futebol Júnior, he was promoted to the first team.

Denner made his senior debut on 25 January 2018, coming on as a second-half substitute for Bruninho in a 1–0 Campeonato Gaúcho away loss against São Luiz. On 15 June, he renewed his contract until 2022.

Denner made his Série B debut on 26 June 2018, replacing Tony in a 1–0 defeat at Vila Nova. He scored his first professional goal on 31 August, netting the opener in a 3–3 away draw against Paysandu.

Denner contributed with one goal in 21 league appearances during his first senior season, as his side suffered relegation.

Career statistics

References

External links
Juventude official profile 
MR Sports Consulting profile 

1999 births
Living people
Sportspeople from Santa Catarina (state)
Brazilian footballers
Association football midfielders
Campeonato Brasileiro Série A players
Campeonato Brasileiro Série B players
Campeonato Brasileiro Série C players
Esporte Clube Juventude players
Club Athletico Paranaense players
Associação Chapecoense de Futebol players
Sport Club do Recife players